Gymnobela is a genus of sea snails, marine gastropod mollusks in the family Raphitomidae.

This genus can sometimes be hardly differentiated from species in the genera Spergo Dall, 1895, Theta Clarke, 1959 and Speoides yoshidae Kuroda & Habe in Habe, 1961 (a synonym of Gymnobela yoshidae (Kuroda & Habe, 1961) )

This genus is highly diverse. It is rather an artificial assemblage of several unrelated genus-level lineages that are unrelated and mostly undescribed.

Description
The rather solid shell is in form and general appearance like Bela. The spire is generally rather short. The body whorl is swollen. The whorls are often shouldered. The sculpture is rather strong. The protoconch has a fine cancellated sculpture. The subsutural band is not strongly marked. The posterior notch of the lip is shallow and usually not very distinct. The operculum is absent.

Fossils have been found in Pliocene strata of Panama and Quaternary strata of Costa Rica (age range: 3.6 to 0.781 Ma).

Species
Species within the genus Gymnobela include:

 Species brought into synonymy
 Gymnobela adenicus [sic]: synonym of Gymnobela adenica Sysoev, 1996
 Gymnobela agassizi [sic]: synonym of Gymnobela agassizii (Verrill & S. Smith [in Verrill], 1880)
 Gymnobela bathyiberica Fechter, 1976 : synonym of Theta vayssierei (Dautzenberg, 1925)
 Gymnobela blakeana extensa Dall, 1881 : synonym of Mioawateria extensa (Dall, 1881)
 Gymnobela brevis Verrill, 1885: synonym of Gymnobela blakeana (Dall, 1881)
 Gymnobela chariessa (Watson, 1881): synonym of Theta chariessa (Watson, 1881)
 Gymnobela curta Verrill, 1884: synonym of Gymnobela aquilarum (Watson, 1882)
 Gymnobela extensa (Dall, 1881): synonym of Mioawateria extensa (Dall, 1881)
 Gymnobela fulvocincta Dautzenberg & Fischer, 1896: synonym of Gymnobela fulvotincta (Dautzenberg & Fischer, 1896)
 Gymnobela gregaria Sykes, 1906: synonym of Gymnobela leptoglypta (Dautzenberg & Fischer, 1896)
 Gymnobela grundifera Dall, 1927: synonym of Daphnella grundifera (Dall, 1927)
 Gymnobela holomera Locard, 1897: synonym of Gymnobela pyrrhogramma (Dautzenberg & Fischer, 1896)
 Gymnobela homeotata (Watson, 1886): synonym of Gymnobela homaeotata (Watson, 1886)
 Gymnobela imitator Dall, 1927: synonym of Pleurotomella imitator (Dall, 1927)
 Gymnobela judithae Clarke, 1989: synonym of Mioawateria extensa (Dall, 1881)
 Gymnobela leptoconchum Locard, 1897: synonym of Gymnobela emertoni (Verrill & Smith in Verrill, 1884)
 Gymnobela lyroniclea [sic]: synonym of Gymnobela lyronuclea (A.H. Clarke, 1959): synonym of Theta lyronuclea (A.H. Clarke, 1959)
 Gymnobela lyronuclea (A.H. Clarke, 1959): synonym of Theta lyronuclea (A.H. Clarke, 1959)
 Gymnobela malmii (Dall, 1889): synonym of Mioawateria malmii (Dall, 1889)
 Gymnobela nudator (Locard, 1897): synonym of Bathybela nudator (Locard, 1897)
 Gymnobela pinguis Locard, 1897: synonym of Gymnobela aquilarum (Watson, 1882)
 † Gymnobela pusula (Laws, 1947): synonym of † Acanthodaphne pusula (Laws, 1947) 
 Gymnobela pycnoides Dautzenberg & Fischer, 1896: synonym of Mioawateria malmii (Dall, 1889)
 Gymnobela recondita Tiberi, 1869: synonym of Gymnobela pyrrhogramma (Dautzenberg & Fischer, 1896)
 Gymnobela rhomboidea Thiele, 1925: synonym of Mioawateria rhomboidea (Thiele, 1925)
 Gymnobela sibogae (Schepman, 1913): synonym of Spergo sibogae Schepman, 1913
 Gymnobela subangulata Verrill, 1884: synonym of Gymnobela aquilarum (Watson, 1882)
 Gymnobela tenelluna (Locard, 1897): synonym of Bathybela tenelluna (Locard, 1897)
 Gymnobela tenellunum [sic]: synonym of Gymnobela tenelluna (Locard, 1897): synonym of Bathybela tenelluna (Locard, 1897)
 Gymnobela tincta Verrill, 1885: synonym of Gymnobela emertoni (Verrill & Smith in Verrill, 1884)
 Gymnobela vayssierei (Dautzenberg, 1925): synonym of Theta vayssierei (Dautzenberg, 1925)
 Gymnobela virgo (Okutani, 1966): synonym of Bathytoma virgo (Okutani, 1966)
 Gymnobela watsoni (Dautzenberg, 1889): synonym of Mioawateria watsoni (Dautzenberg, 1889)

References

External links
 Gymnobela A. E. Verrill, 1884 at the Global Biodiversity Information Facility
 Gymnobela on Animal Diversity Web
 Worldwide Mollusc Species Data Base: Raphitomidae
 
 Cossmann, M. (1896). Essais de paléoconchologie comparée. Deuxième livraison. Paris, The author and Comptoir Géologique. 179 pp., 8 pls

 
Raphitomidae